Mynydd Hendre-ddu or Mynydd Hendreddu is a mountain in southern Snowdonia, Wales. It is one of a line of mountains running from Mynydd Dolgoed in the north, through Mynydd Llwydiarth to Mynydd Hendre-ddu and on to Mynydd y Foel, Y Grug, Mynydd Tri-Arglwyd and Mynydd Gwyn to the south of the village of Aberangell. It forms the watershed between Nant Llwydiarth, which flows to the south-west and into the Afon Dulas, and streams flowing into Afon Angell to the north, which flow east into the River Dyfi.

Mynydd Hendre-ddu is one of the Dyfi hills.

References

Mountains and hills of Snowdonia
Landmarks in Wales
Mountains and hills of Gwynedd
Mawddwy
Dyfi Hills